Rainier is a city in Thurston County, Washington, United States. Beginning as a train stop in the 1870s, Rainier was first settled in 1890 and would become known as a logging town. The city was officially incorporated in 1947.

History

Rainier began in the 1870s as a stop on the Northern Pacific Railroad line between Kalama, Washington and Tacoma. Situated amidst the ‘ten al quelth’ prairies – Lushootseed for "the best yet" – it was named for its view of Mount Rainier. In 1890, Albert and Maria Gehrke were the first permanent settlers to homestead in Rainier; later that year a store and post office were established by Henry Harmer, who homesteaded with his wife Jessie and children on the Deschutes river near Rainier. Rainier was officially platted in 1891.

In 1896, the community's first full-time school as well as a Lutheran church were built by Albert Gehrke and his two brothers, Theodore and Paul; the buildings are now state historic landmarks.

In 1906, the Bob White Lumber Company opened, bringing prosperity to the area through logging and sawmilling. Other lumber companies, such as Deschutes, Gruber and Docherty, and Fir Tree, were soon attracted to the area as well. In the late 1920s and early 1930s, several of these mill operations and many of the local buildings were destroyed by a series of fires, leading many residents to seek work at Weyerhaeuser Lumber at nearby Vail, which is now a ghost town.

Rainier's 1940 population was 500. In 1941, the WPA Guide to Washington described Rainier as "the social center for farmers and loggers of the vicinity, although its closed mills and vacant houses mark it as a ghost lumber town."

Rainier was officially incorporated on October 23, 1947.

Geography
In terms of land cover, 18% (179 acres) of the city is urban, 27% is forested, and 55% is covered with non-forest vegetation and soils.

The climate of Rainier tends to be relatively mild. Although the temperature reached a record high of 104 Fahrenheit in 1981, the average temperature of the hottest month, August, is 77 °F. Similarly, while the record low temperature was -8 °F in 1979, the average temperature of January, the coldest month, is 32 Fahrenheit. With an average of 8.13 inches of rainfall, November is the wettest month. Rainier averages approximately 50 inches of precipitation a year.

Demographics

At the time of the census of 2020, there were 2,369 people residing in Rainier, living in 871 households. The median household income was $76,016. 14.3% of residents reported having earned a bachelor's degree or higher level of education.

The median age in Rainier was 38.4 years old,  with 27.4% of the population under the age of 18, and 72.6% of residents 18 years or older.
Of the 2,369 residents, 30 identified as American Indian and Alaska Native, 47 as Asian, 22 as Black or African American, 192 as Hispanic or Latino, 16 as Native Hawaiian and Pacific Islander, 1,969 as White, 60 as "some other race," and 225 as "two or more races"; 192 identified themselves as Hispanic or Latino of any race, while 1,882 identified as "Not Hispanic or Latino."

As of the census of 2010, there were 1,794 people, 656 households, and 484 families residing in the city. The racial makeup of the city was 90.7% White, 1.2% African American, 1.2% Native American, 1.1% Asian, 0.1% Pacific Islander, 1.1% from other races, and 4.6% from two or more races. Hispanic or Latino of any race were 5.0% of the population.

There were 656 households, of which 40.1% had children under the age of 18 living with them, 54.1% were married couples living together, 13.4% had a female householder with no husband present, 6.3% had a male householder with no wife present, and 26.2% were non-families. 20.3% of all households were made up of individuals, and 5.6% had someone living alone who was 65 years of age or older. The average household size was 2.73 and the average family size was 3.11.

The median age in the city was 37.1 years. 26.1% of residents were under the age of 18; 7% were between the ages of 18 and 24; 28.2% were from 25 to 44; 29.2% were from 45 to 64; and 9.4% were 65 years of age or older. The gender makeup of the city was 49.7% male and 50.3% female.

As of the census of 2000, there were 1,492 people, 530 households, and 410 families residing in Rainier. The population density was 922.8 people per square mile (355.6/km2). There were 551 housing units at an average density of 340.8 per square mile (131.3/km2). The racial makeup of the city was 92.56% White, 0.54% African American, 1.81% Native American, 0.74% Asian, 0.27% Pacific Islander, 0.80% from other races, and 3.28% from two or more races. Hispanic or Latino of any race were 3.89% of the population.

There were 530 households, out of which 40.9% had children under the age of 18 living with them, 61.9% were married couples living together, 10.9% had a female householder with no husband present, and 22.5% were non-families. 17.7% of all households were made up of individuals, and 4.5% had someone living alone who was 65 years of age or older. The average household size was 2.82 and the average family size was 3.17.

In the city, the age distribution of the population shows 30.6% under the age of 18, 7.0% from 18 to 24, 32.1% from 25 to 44, 21.8% from 45 to 64, and 8.6% who were 65 years of age or older. The median age was 34 years. For every 100 females, there were 98.4 males. For every 100 females age 18 and over, there were 95.5 males.

The median income for a household in Rainier was $42,955, and the median income for a family was $44,226. Males had a median income of $34,609 versus $27,375 for females. The per capita income for the city was $16,636. About 6.6% of families and 6.8% of the population were below the poverty line, including 6.8% of those under age 18 and 6.8% of those age 65 or over.

Arts and culture

Festivals and events
Rainier hosts several annual events. In August, Rainier Roundup Days include a community parade and a bluegrass music festival. Also in August, the Rainier Community & Alumni Celebration is held to honor all past & present residents of Rainier. The community regularly hosts Relay for Life, during which, over an 18-hour time frame, participants walk around the high school track to raise money for the American Cancer Society.

Historical buildings and sites

In the early 2000s, the Rainier Historical Society, under the non-profit parent corporation of the Rainier Area Building Community, began restoring Rainier's historic schoolhouse, which was built in 1915, and converting it into a community center known as the Lifelong Learning Center. In 2005, the Rainier Food Bank was opened at the site, serving patrons on Wednesdays and Saturdays. A thrift store was also opened, with the proceeds going to fund the operational costs of the building. An art gallery and public meeting rooms followed. In November 2009, the Rainier Volunteer Library opened at the center, featuring a collection of donated books available for borrowing. A partnership with the Timberland Regional Library brought the addition of a computer kiosk and the ability to pick up reserved books from the Timberland Regional Library system at the Rainier Volunteer Library. In the fall of 2011, the food bank, under the name Rainier Emergency Food Center, relocated to a nearby church due to safety concerns at the historic schoolhouse. The building, which had been near demolition, was returned to the school district to be used for offices in 2015, its centennial year, and the library and thrift store were closed.

Parks and recreation

Rainier features eight acres of parks. In the center of town, the Veterans Memorial Park is dedicated to "all veterans, active duty personnel, reservists of the armed services, and members of police and fire services, and any individual or group that serves our community and country."

Nearby, Wilkowski Park is the site of the Rainier Roundup, the city's annual bluegrass music festival occurring on the fourth weekend in August. Beside the park, the Yelm–Rainier–Tenino Trail connects the cities of Yelm, Rainier, and Tenino in a paved pathway for pedestrians and cyclists.

Other parks in Rainier include Gehrke Park, Holiday Park, and Raintree Park.

Government

Rainier has a mayor–council government. In 2017, Robert Shaw became the mayor of Rainier. The city council has five members. Other government positions in Rainier include that of city administrator, clerk, treasurer, city attorney, fire chief, and public works director.

Education
Rainier is served by the Rainier School District. The district consists of an elementary school, a middle school, and a high school. As of the 2021-2022 school year, the district's enrollment was 925 students, taught by 56 teachers.

As of the 2021-2022 school year, Rainier Elementary School was serving 463 students from kindergarten through fifth grade. The enrollment of Rainier Middle School, which serves sixth through eighth grade, was 215 in the 2021-2022 school year, with the principal as of 2017 being John Beckman. Rainier High School included 247 students from ninth through twelfth grade in the 2021-2022 school year.

Notable people
 
Linda Evans, television actress
Chad Forcier, two-time NBA champion assistant coach
Eloy Pérez, WBO and NABO super featherweight champion
Billie Rogers, jazz trumpeter and singer

See also
 Washington State Route 507
 Deschutes River (Washington)

References

External links
 City of Rainier
 Rainier School District

Cities in Thurston County, Washington
Cities in Washington (state)